The Hebron Subdistrict was one of the subdistricts of Mandatory Palestine. It was located around the city of Hebron. After the 1948 Arab-Israeli War, the subdistrict disintegrated.

Depopulated towns and villages 

(current localities in parentheses)

 'Ajjur (Agur, Li-On, Tirosh)
 Barqusya 
 Bayt Jibrin (Beit Guvrin)
 Bayt Nattif  
 al-Dawayima (Amatzya)
 Deir al-Dubban (Luzit)

 Dayr Nakhkhas 
 Kudna (Beit Nir)
 Mughallis (Gefen)
 al-Qubayba (Lachish)
 Ra'na (Gal On)

 Tell es-Safi 
 Khirbat Umm Burj (Nehusha)
 az-Zakariyya (Zekharia)
 Zayta
 Zikrin 

Subdistricts of Mandatory Palestine